Sessums may refer to:

People with the surname
Davis Sessums (1858-1929), American Episcopalian bishop
J. Kim Sessums, American sculptor
Kevin Sessums (born 1956), American author
T. Terrell Sessums (1930-2020), American politician

Locations
Sessums, Mississippi, unincorporated community in Mississippi, USA
Sessums Glacier, glacier on the Antarctic